Oran Wendle Eagleson (1910–1997) was the Callaway Professor of Psychology at Spelman College, Atlanta. He was the eighth black person in the United States to receive a doctorate in psychology.

Early life and education
Oran Wendle Eagleson was born in Unionville, Indiana in 1910. In Bloomington, Indiana he completed his PhD at Indiana University in 1935. He also earned a bachelor's degree in 1931 and a master's in 1932, both in Indiana. Eagleson worked as a shoe shiner and shoe repair finisher from high school through graduate years.

Career
It was hard for Eagleson to find employment with his psychology degree. He found a job in 1936 in Durham, North Carolina at the North Carolina College for Negroes, where he taught psychology, sociology, economics, and philosophy. After financial issues in Durham, he moved to Atlanta, Georgia to teach at Spelman, a women's college. At Spelman, he was high paid, but psychology was not a major. It was an elective until a few years later. Eagleson also served as an exchange professor at Atlanta University where he taught graduate courses. 

He became the dean of instruction at Spelman in 1954 and in 1970 he was promoted as Callaway Professor of Psychology. He was co-director of Morehouse-Spelman Intensified Pre-College program. He was also a lecturer and consultant in orientation and training project conducted by the Peace Corps.

References

Bibliography

1910 births
1997 deaths
20th-century African-American academics
20th-century American academics
20th-century American psychologists
People from Monroe County, Indiana
Indiana University Bloomington alumni
North Carolina Central University faculty
Spelman College faculty